The Trouble with Poets is an album by American singer/songwriter Peter Mulvey, released in 2000.

Reception

Writing for Allmusic, critic Evan Cator wrote of the album, "...for all his skill as a guitarist, Mulvey's musical compositions only fitfully match the brilliance of his lyrics. Melody has never been his strongest suit, and he is somewhat limited as a singer. But despite the inconsistencies, it doesn't take a poet to see poetry in The Trouble With Poets."

Track listing
All songs by Peter Mulvey and David Goodrich unless otherwise noted.
"The Trouble With Poets" – 3:40
"Words Too Small to Say" – 3:57
"Check Me Out (Hey Hey Hey)" – 3:47
"Every Word Except Goodbye" – 3:49
"Wings of the Ragman" – 3:47
"You Meet the Nicest People in Your Dreams" (Al Goodhart, Al Hoffman) – 2:06
"Eyes Front (See Through You)" – 3:55
"All the Way Home" – 3:00
"Bright Idea" – 4:43
"Tender Blindspot" (Peter Mulvey) – 4:23
"Home" – 2:56

Personnel
Peter Mulvey – vocals, guitar
David "Goody" Goodrich – guitar, mandolin, bass guitar
Mike Piehl – drums
Jennifer Kimball – vocals

Production notes
David Goodrich – producer
Joe Panzetta – design
Amy Ruppel – paintings, illustrations
Joan Yokum – photography

References

Peter Mulvey albums
2000 albums